This list of electoral wards in Mid Glamorgan includes council wards which elected councillors to Mid Glamorgan County Council during its existence from 1 April 1974 to 1 April 1996.

Wards

1973–1989

The first Mid Glamorgan Council elections took place in April 1973. Eighty five county councillors were elected from sixty eight electoral wards. as follows (numbers of councillors in brackets):

1989–1996

Following The County of Mid Glamorgan (Electoral Arrangements) Order 1988 the number of wards were increased to 74, taking effect from the 1989 elections (and preparatory activity beforehand). Each ward elected one county councillor to Mid Glamorgan Council, totalling 74.

Mid Glamorgan was divided into local government districts (often with borough status), namely  Borough of Cynon Valley, Borough of Merthyr Tydfil, Borough of Ogwr, Borough of Rhondda, District of Rhymney Valley and Borough of Taff-Ely. These also had their own elected borough or district council.

* = Community (community ward of)

See also
 List of electoral wards in Bridgend County Borough
 List of electoral wards in Merthyr Tydfil County Borough
 List of electoral wards in Rhondda Cynon Taf
 List of electoral wards in Wales

References

Mid Glamorgan